Lac d'Armaille is a lake at Saint-Germain-les-Paroisses in the Ain department of France.

Armaille